Cass County Courthouse or Cass County Court House may refer to:

Cass County Courthouse (Missouri), Harrisonville, Missouri
Cass County Courthouse (Illinois), Virginia, Illinois, one of Illinois' county courthouses
Cass County Courthouse (Michigan), Casspopolis, Michigan, a Michigan State Historic Site
Cass County Courthouse (Iowa), Atlantic, Iowa
Cass County Courthouse (Nebraska), Plattsmouth, Nebraska
Cass County Court House, Jail, and Sheriff's House, Fargo, North Dakota
Cass County Courthouse (Texas), Linden, Texas